RAF Blakelaw (sometimes known as RAF Newcastle) was a Royal Air Force station which acted as headquarters for No.13 Group during the Second World War and which was located in Blakelaw, Northumberland (now a suburb of Newcastle upon Tyne).

Function
The station was established in Spring 1940 to act as headquarters for No.13 Group whose area encompassed North of the Humber and all of Scotland. The Operations Centre of No. 13 Group was housed there in three buildings (Operations Room, Filter Room and Communications Centre), which were partially buried for protection, in a similar way to buildings for No. 9 Group RAF at RAF Barton Hall, No. 10 Group RAF at RAF Box, No. 11 Group RAF at RAF Uxbridge, No. 12 Group RAF at RAF Watnall and No. 14 Group RAF at Raigmore House. No.13 Group merged with No. 14 Group in July 1943.
 
Operations room
The operations room, responsible for directing RAF aircraft in the No. 13 Group area, was located in a bunker at Kenton Bar. It was fully operational by December 1939. When No.13 Group merged with No. 14 Group in July 1943 the operations room was converted for use as a sector operations room and continued in that use until Summer 1945. The operations room was used as a regional war room from the early 1950s until the early 1960s.
 
Filter room

The Filter room, responsible for filtering large quantities of intelligence on enemy activity before it was passed to the operations room, was located in a bunker at Blakelaw Quarry. It was fully operational by late 1940. When No.13 Group merged with No. 14 Group in July 1943 the filter room was taken out of use. The filter room was acquired by Newcastle City Council and was used as a civil defence centre from 1952 until 1968.

The Communications centre has not been found.

See also
List of former Royal Air Force stations
No. 13 Group RAF
Kenton, Newcastle upon Tyne

References

External links
Bunker 13
Secret Bunker North
British Listed Buildings

Royal Air Force stations in Northumberland
Buildings and structures in Northumberland
Military history of Tyne and Wear
Royal Air Force stations of World War II in the United Kingdom